Eduardo Paes Barreto Amaral (born 29 June 1967) is a retired Brazilian Paralympic judoka who competed at international level events. He is a Paralympic silver medalist and a Parapan American Games bronze medalist.

References

1967 births
Living people
Sportspeople from Rio de Janeiro (state)
Paralympic judoka of Brazil
Judoka at the 2004 Summer Paralympics
Judoka at the 2008 Summer Paralympics
Medalists at the 2004 Summer Paralympics
Brazilian male judoka
Medalists at the 2007 Parapan American Games
20th-century Brazilian people
21st-century Brazilian people